Wanderlust is a romance novel by American Danielle Steel. The book was originally published on June 1, 1986, by Dell Publications, receiving a short number of both positive and negative editorial reviews. It is Steel's 20th novel.

Plot
The plot follows Audrey Driscoll, a fictional character, travelling from America to China, Germany, England and North Africa. She is repeatedly made to choose between her desire for her adventure, or to abide by her conscience.

References

1986 American novels
Travel novels
American romance novels
Novels by Danielle Steel
American travel books
Delacorte Press books